The following is a list of annual leaders in saves in Major League Baseball (MLB), with separate lists for the American League and the National League. The list includes several professional leagues and associations that were never part of MLB.

In baseball, a save is credited to a pitcher who finishes a game for the winning team under prescribed circumstances. Most commonly a relief pitcher ("reliever") earns a save by entering in the ninth inning of a game in which his team is winning by three or fewer runs and finishing the game by pitching one inning without losing the lead. The statistic was created by Jerome Holtzman in 1959 to "measure the effectiveness of relief pitchers" and was adopted as an MLB official statistic in 1969. The save has been retroactively measured for pitchers before that date.

MLB recognizes the player or players in each league with the most saves each season. In retrospect, the five saves by Jack Manning meant he led the National League in its inaugural year, while Bill Hoffer was the American League's first saves champion with three. Mordecai Brown was the first pitcher to record at least 10 saves in a season. Dan Quisenberry, Bruce Sutter, Firpo Marberry, and Ed Walsh are the only pitchers to lead the league in saves five times (though Marberry and Walsh did so before 1969). Sutter is also tied with Harry Wright, Dan Quisenberry and Craig Kimbrel for the most consecutive seasons leading the league in saves with four. 


American League

National League

American Association

National Association

Union Association

Player's League

Federal League

Footnotes
Recognized "major leagues" include the American League and National League and several defunct leagues—the American Association, Federal League, Players' League, and Union Association. The National Association is also included in this list as its records are included in statistics found on sites such as Baseball-Reference.com; however, it is not recognized as a major league by Major League Baseball.

References

General

Inline citations

Saves champions
Saves